Geeta Dharmarajan (born 19 September 1948) is an Indian writer, educator and social activist. She is known as the founder of Katha, a "profit for all"  social organization  and as the Editor in Chief of Katha Press, one of the 10 Top Children's Book Publishers in India in 2022  Katha is also known as a publisher for children in Hindi  Her books include Thangam of Mehargarh,  Days with Thathu. I am Najar-am-Radh. She is the editor of Katha Prize Stories  

Geeta is the founding Executive Director of Katha, a nonprofit organisation that she started in 1988. Today, she is the  President/ Chairman of the  Katha Board. Her work over the last 33 years has focussed on quality publishing and sustainable education, especially of children from poor families.

Katha is a registered non-profit and non-governmental organisation based in Delhi and Chennai. Learning from how children and communities learn,  her I Love Reading Initiative won the Millennium Alliance Award in 2012, from the Governments of India and the USA, and Dharmarajan was dubbed  Frugal Innovator.         

Charles Landry says in his book, "The Art of City Making": "Katha stands as an exemplar for all the creative projects around the world that grapple with ordinary and dramatic misery in cities.”   

Katha's 300 Million Citizens' Challenge takes the challenge of the 300 million children in schools in India today, of which more than 50% cannot read well through a portal that works through partnerships.

She heads the Katha Adivasi and Dalit Learning (kadl) Labs that work in association with the Tamil Nadu Government, to improve learning outcomes for children from some of India's most oppressed/ suppressed communities. The Unpress is a small imprint of Katha, that makes learning fun and relevant for such rural government school children.

Dharmarajan's professional experience started in 1977 when she was Honorary Director of the Women's Voluntary Service (WVS) of The Nilgiris District in Tamil Nadu. With over 45 years of experience, her editorial experience that began with Target, a children's magazine, continued with The Pennsylvania Gazette, the award-winning alumni magazine of the University of Pennsylvania. Geeta's published works include more than 50 children's books and over 450 individual pieces in magazines and newspapers.    

Geeta is the recipient of, inter alia, two Lifetime Achievement Awards, two Rotary Awards, the Yatra Award for Translation (Rupa&Co., 1998), the Millennium Alliance Frugal Innovator Award (2014) from the Governments of India and the USA; the Business Standard Entrepreneur of the Year Award (2018), and the Sat Paul Mittal Award (2020). She served as the Chairperson of the National Bal Bhavan ( 2011-2013) a dream project of India's first Prime Minister, Jawaharlal Nehru,  for children. 

The Government of India awarded her the 4th highest civilian honour, the Padma Shri in 2012. for her work in literature and education.

Personal life

Geeta Dharmarajan was born in Chennai in the Indian state of Tamil Nadu in 1948.  She was introduced early to the diversity of India through the work of her father, N. Krishnaswamy a doctor and allergist. Her mother is Kalyani Krishnaswamy, a poet and composer of classical Carnatic padams. 

She started learning classical Bharatanatyam and Carnatic music when she was seven years old. This led to a lifelong engagement with the Bharata's Natya Shastra. And led to her ideating Katha’s unique curriculum, or StoryPedagogy which has been the underlying credo of Katha Books and in Katha learning centres since 1992. The principles of StoryPedagogy are based on India’s traditional storytelling practices and on the 2,000-year-old treatise -- Bharata’s Natya Shastra. 

She was educated in Holy Angels' High School where she represented the school in dance and netball. She was elected Head Girl of the school and led the south Indian contingent to the Bharat Girl Guides Jamboree in her final year. She graduated from Stella Maris College in English Literature, standing fourth in the State of Tamil Nadu. She has audit courses at the University of Pennsylvania when she was working there (1983-85). And studied at Harvard University's Business School Executive Education programme, in 2000.

Katha Books 
Geeta is the editor in chief of Katha's list which includes the Katha Prize Stories. She has edited stories from more than 300 of India's best literary talents, writing in 21 Indian languages. Katha Books are a showcase of contemporary Indian fiction for adults and children. Katha introduced an array of writings from India's many oral and written traditions to children, ages 0 – 17. Classy productions, child friendly layouts and illustrations go in tandem with excellent writing. Her major activities include the institution of the Katha Awards for Literary Excellence, and curating the Katha Festivals and utsavs that bring literature to the public. These create meeting places for writers, translators, scholars, critics, storytellers and contemporary artists and community activists. Geeta led the writers workshop initiative for the central Board of Secondary Education, with partnerships established in 500 schools in India

Katha Schools 
The Katha Lab School (KLS) was started in 1990 with five children, by Geeta Dharmarajan. She started the Katha School of Entrepreneurship in 1995. And the Katha Infotech and Ecom School (kites) in 2001. And ideated the StoryPedagogy in 2001. She continued to mentor and work with the teachers till 2016.  

The Katha Lab School is a centre of creativity, with its unique StoryPedagogy, stories by established and emerging writers and illustrators that make reading a pleasure for children from nonliterate, underserved families; a relevant education for all round development programme and   "No textbooks" classrooms, since 1990,  had inspired children in k-12, to become reader-leaders, starting early.  

The Katha School Leaving Certificate is a triple-braided recognition. KLS awards an "O level" in Entrepreneurship and Computers at the 10th grade, along with the national exam students take. And "A level" certificates in Entrepreneurship and Computers with the 12th grade government national exam.

KLS stands as an achievement for the slum cluster it is situated in, producing professionals every year who become entrepreneurs who support their families, or go on to higher studies. Over the last decade, Katha graduates earn 100 times what the family once did, with more than 80% of Katha's children going to  tertiary education and college. 

It was recently visited by The Prince of Wales.

References 

Living people
20th-century Indian educators
20th-century Indian businesswomen
20th-century Indian businesspeople
Indian women editors
Indian editors
Recipients of the Padma Shri in literature & education
Businesspeople from Chennai
1948 births
20th-century Indian women writers
Businesswomen from Tamil Nadu
Indian women philanthropists
Indian philanthropists
20th-century Indian journalists
Women writers from Tamil Nadu
Writers from Chennai
Educators from Tamil Nadu
Women educators from Tamil Nadu
20th-century women educators